The 2011 CIS Women's Volleyball Championship was held March 4, 2011 to March 6, 2011, in Quebec City, Quebec, to determine a national champion for the 2010–11 CIS women's volleyball season. The tournament was played at PEPS at Université Laval. It was the sixth time that Laval had hosted the tournament and the first time since hosting back-to-back tournaments in 2002 and 2003.

The top-seeded UBC Thunderbirds won their fourth consecutive national championship following their sweep of the host Laval Rouge et Or. With the victory, the Thunderbirds set a CIS record with the eighth championship win in program history, which broke a three-way tie with the Winnipeg Wesmen and Alberta Pandas who had won seven each.

Participating teams

Championship bracket

Consolation bracket

Awards

Championship awards 
CIS Tournament MVP – Shanice Marcelle, UBC
R.W. Pugh Fair Play Award – Brina Derksen-Bergen, UBC

All-Star Team 
Jaki Ellis, Alberta
Lauren O'Reilly, Trinity Western
Mélanie Savoie, Laval
Shanice Marcelle, UBC
Marie-Christine Mondor, Laval
Jen Hinze, UBC
Kyla Richey, UBC

References

External links 
 Tournament Web Site

U Sports volleyball
2011 in women's volleyball
Université Laval